Sergio Vez (born 13 May 1994 in Basauri, Basque Country, Spain; also known as Sergio Vez Labrador) is a Spanish curler. During his career he has represented Spain in 252 international games. Since 2013 he has maintained his role as skip in all competitions.

Teams

Mixed

Mixed doubles

Junior

University

Men's

References

External links
 
 
 World Mixed Doubles Curling Championship 2018 — How curling's more than just a game for Spain's Garcia (web-archive)
 Sergio Vez, un gigante en un deporte pequeño. Deia, Noticias de Bizkaia  (web archive)

Living people
1994 births
People from Basauri
Sportspeople from Biscay
Spanish male curlers
Spanish curling champions
Competitors at the 2015 Winter Universiade
21st-century Spanish people